The Stutsman County Courthouse and Sheriff's Residence/Jail in Jamestown, North Dakota was built in 1883. It was listed on the National Register of Historic Places in 1976.

It was designed by architect Henry C. Koch.

The west wing of the building was added in 1926, and was designed by architect Gilbert R. Horton.

Its NRHP listing was consistent with a later statewide study of North Dakota courthouses.

The building was used as the courthouse for Stutsman County until the 1980s, when it was replaced by a newer building. Though plans called for the original building's destruction, ownership instead transferred to the State Historical Society of North Dakota, who is working to restore the courthouse and has listed the building as Stutsman County Courthouse State Historic Site.

References

External links

 Stutsman County Courthouse State Historic Site - State Historical Society of North Dakota

Courthouses on the National Register of Historic Places in North Dakota
County courthouses in North Dakota
Buildings and structures in Jamestown, North Dakota
Gothic Revival architecture in North Dakota
Government buildings completed in 1883
North Dakota State Historic Sites
National Register of Historic Places in Stutsman County, North Dakota
1883 establishments in Dakota Territory
Jails on the National Register of Historic Places in North Dakota